The Wanda–Zhonghe–Shulin line or Light Green (code LG) line is a metro line under construction in Taipei. It is managed by the Taipei City Government Department of Rapid Transit Systems and scheduled to be complete in 2025. Following the Taipei Metro's color coding scheme, the Wanda-Zhonghe-Shulin line will be light green, coding the line as LG. When Phase I is completed, the line is expected to carry 270,000 riders per day, and passengers will be able to travel between the terminus at Zhonghe Senior High School and Taipei Main Station in 25 minutes.

Phase I 
This medium-capacity route was approved by the Executive Yuan on 12 February 2010. It is split into two phases. Phase I consists of nine underground stations and a depot in Jincheng Road. Also, this line goes under the Xindian River between LG04 and LG05. Jincheng Road (LG08) is where the other terminus is located, and will be named as Zhonghe Senior High School Station.
A branch line consists of only Zhonghe Senior High School and Juguang stations.

Stations
Stations LG01–08A are currently under construction, scheduled for completion in 2025.

Phase II 
Phase II is approved for construction. Stations LG01 to LG10 are underground, while stations LG11 to LG21 are elevated.

The Taipei City Government is the local authority. The funds will be borne by the Central Government and the New Taipei City Government. The total project funding is about 55.881 billion NTD. The current plan has been submitted to Ministry of Transportation and Communications on 26 January 2017. The ministry deliberated, and the high-speed railway engineering bureau of the ministry is conducting a written review operation in conjunction with relevant units. The second phase of the route is located within New Taipei City. At present, changes to urban planning and bidding for basic designs have begun. After the Taipei and New Taipei City conferences are held to reach a consensus, the plan will be submitted to the central government for further review. On 2 May 2018, the Ministry of Transportation and Communications merged the project into the second phase of the project of Forward-Looking Infrastructure.

Stations 
Stations LG09–21 are currently under construction, scheduled for completion in 2028.

Dates 
October 2014: Groundbreaking ceremony held in New Taipei City
8 November 2014: Groundbreaking ceremony held in Taipei City

References 

Taipei Metro
Standard gauge railways in Taiwan
2025 in rail transport